(born 27 November 1954) is a noted Indian political theorist, who was professor of political theory at the Jawaharlal Nehru University, Delhi. His works on political theory, multiculturalism, identity politics and secularism have evoked sharp debates.

He is Honorary Fellow and Founder Director, Parekh Institute of Indian Thought, CSDS (Centre for the Study of Developing Societies) Delhi. He has been former Director of the Centre between 2007-2014.  He is also Honorary fellow, Balliol College, Oxford.

Education
He received his B.A. degree in economics from the University of Delhi, followed by M.Phil. and D.Phil. from Oxford University.

Career
Bhargava started his academic career at St. Stephen's College, Delhi in 1979, in the following year he joined the Jawaharlal Nehru University, Delhi where he worked till 2005, when he joined Centre for the Study of Developing Societies (CSDS), Delhi as a senior fellow and from 2007-2014, was its director. He formally retired in 2019 but continues to be an Honorary Fellow and Director of its Parekh Institute of Indian Thought.  

Over the years, he has been faculty fellow in ethics at Harvard University, Leverhulme Fellow at University of Bristol, senior fellow at Institute of Advanced Studies, Jerusalem, fellow, Wissenschaftkolleg, Berlin, fellow, Institute of Human Sciences, Vienna, visiting fellow of the British Academy, Berggruen Fellow, CASBS, Stanford, Tsinghua University, China and NYU between 2015-2017, Professorial Fellow, Institute of Social Justice, ACU, Sydney and held the Asia Chair at Sciences Po Paris in 2006. In 2022, he was Senior Research Fellow at the Multiple Secularities project, University of Leipzig.    

Bhargava writes a regular column for the Indian national daily, The Hindu. He also served on the Social Sciences jury for the Infosys Prize in 2019. in 2009, Bhargava was awarded the UGC national award for his contribution to political science and in 2011, the Malcolm Adiseshiah award for his contribution to the social sciences.

Selected works
 Individualism in Social Science, (Clarendon Press, Oxford, 1992) This book offers a balanced, subtle critique of methodoloigical individualism.  
 Secularism and its critics, (Oxford University Press, 1998) The first major anthology of its kind that sparked international academic interest in secularism.  
 Multiculturalism, Liberalism and Democracy (OUP, 1999). This book looks into the cultural dimension of political and political dimensions of identity and culture.
 Politics and Ethics of the Indian Constitution (OUP, 2008). This book examines Indian constitution from the perspective of political theory. 
 What is Political Theory why do we need it? (OUP, Delhi, 2010). In this book Bhargava clarifies concepts like secularism, multiculturalism, socialism, individualism and ethnocentrism etc. 
 The Promise of India's secular democracy (OUP, Delhi, 2010). This book explores the politics of secularism in India.
 Secular States and Religious Diversity (UBC Press, Vancouver, 2013). He gave the concept of Principled Distance model of secularism as an alternative model to be more suitable for a heterogeneous society like India.
 Politics, Ethics and the Self: Re-reading Gandhi's Hind Swaraj, ( Routledge, London and New Delhi, 2022). Based on a conference on Hind Swaraj's centenary. Puts together essays by the most eminent contemporary writers on Gandhi.  
 " Between Hope and Despair: 100 Ethical Reflections on Contemporary India" ( Bloomsbury, New Delhi, 2023). This book, written for a wider, non-academic readership, is on the crisis of India's collective ethical identity.
 "Bridging the Two worlds: Comparing classical political thought and statecraft in India and Chinaa (ed with Amitabh Acharya,Daniel Bell and Yan Xuetong), California University Press, 2023.

References

External links
 Rajeev Bhargava at Centre for the Study of Developing Societies (CSDS)

20th-century Indian economists
1954 births
Living people
Indian political philosophers
Indian political writers
Delhi University alumni
Alumni of the University of Oxford
Academic staff of Jawaharlal Nehru University
Academic staff of Delhi University
Centre for Political Studies (CPS), Jawaharlal Nehru University